Tahajjud Cinta is a Malaysian television drama series broadcast by Rumah Karya Citra in 2011. It features Nur Fazura, Fouziah Gous, Eman Manan and Remy Ishak. It aired on 8 July 2011 after 13 successful episodes. This drama tells us about religious devotion and love to be able to motivate a person to do something much less noble to do something extraordinary.

Synopsis
Tahajjud Cinta story about the sacrifice of two women, Citra Maisara (Nur Fazura) and Seri (Fouziah Gous) in the fight for truth, rights and reputation of women. Derived from two different backgrounds, Citra is the daughter of a married couple is the leader of a big company. For 5 years studying abroad, Citra's parents never knew that their daughter whom they sent to London to pursue Civil, had secretly migrated to Jordan to explore the field of Shari'a law. In it, Citra reunited with her close friends Seri, who shared the same ambitions.

Their lives began being bombarded with many trials and great pressure after returning to the bosom of their families in Malaysia. Back at the Malaysia, Citra parents are very surprised with the changes and approvals obtained. So frustrated with the actions, Citra's parents will not allow Citra the resolve to pursue her dream as a Syariah lawyer.

But everything changes when her sister, Emelda (Tiz Zaqyah) suffer as a result of violence by her husband (Heryanto Hassan). Seeing the seriousness of the oppression of Emelda defend her husband, Citra parents finally endorsing the struggle.

In contrast, the fate of Seri, where she had to forget her ambitions as a Syariah lawyer. As the request of her father (Ahmad Tarmimi Siregar), Seri was forced to marry Ustaz Shauki (Eman Manan) that has been financing Seri overseas studies. Unfortunately,  Seri victims of flogging Ustaz Shauki that already had three wives (Erma Fatima), (Melissa Saila) and (Dira Abu Zahar). Seri is forced to forget her love for Sollahudin (Remy Ishak), son of Ustaz Shauki.

This situation also cut Ustaz Shauki three wives feelings very jealous of the Seri. Although tormented, for family firm and pleased to continue to live, Seri throw her ambition to succeed as a Syariah lawyer. However, the situation start change when the emergence of Armani (Neelofa).

Cast

Main character
 Nur Fazura as Citra Maisara
 Fouziah Gous as Seri
 Eman Manan as Ustaz Sauki
 Remy Ishak as Solahudin

Extended cast
 Tiz Zaqyah as Emelda
 Aaron Aziz as Iskandar
 Shahz Jaszle as Azihan
 Fazreen Rafi as Wahdi
 Jins Shamsuddin as Tan Sri
 Norish Karman as Nora
 Neelofa as Suraya
 Ahmad Tamimi Siregar as Pak Azim
 Eirma Fatima as Hamani
 Dira Abu Zahar as Umairah
 Ziela Jalil as Qadirah
 Azizah Mahzan as Puan Sri
 Heryanto Hassan as Tengku Irfan
 Fadhilah Mansor as Habibah
 Melissa Saila as Syarifah
 Anne Abdullah as Zulaika
 Zack Taipan as Karim
 Chomatt Samad as Yusof
 Amar as Radzwill
 Zainul Ariffin as Edinson Cavani
 Muhammad Bukhori as Frank Lampard

Awards and nominations

References

External links
Tahajjud Cinta Official Website

Malaysian drama television series
2011 Malaysian television series debuts